{{Speciesbox
| name = Nsenene
| image = Ruspolia nitidula male (3788698376).jpg
| image_caption = Nsenene look-alike (Ruspolia nitidula)
| genus = Ruspolia
| species = differens
| authority = (Serville, 1838)
| synonyms =  * Conocephalus albidonervis Redtenbacher, 1891
 Conocephalus exiguus Stål, 1876
 Conocephalus lemus Redtenbacher, 1891
 Conocephalus longipennis Redtenbacher, 1891
 Conocephalus vicinus Walker, 1869
 Conocephalus (Homorocoryphus) melanostictus Karny, 1907
 Homorocoryphus mediotessellatus Karny, 1917
}}

Nsenene is the Luganda name for Ruspolia differens: a bush cricket (a.k.a. katydids or misnamed "long-horned grasshoppers") in the tribe Copiphorini of the 'cone-head' subfamily. It is often confused with the closely related Ruspolia nitidula.

Distribution and traditional beliefs

This species has long been known as one of the many totems of Buganda Kingdom of Uganda. They were founded by Seruwu Douglass from Ssese Islands in Masaka. This species is a delicacy in central and south-western Uganda, as well as an important source of income. The insect is also found in South Africa, Malawi, Ivory Coast, Congo, Ghana, Kenya, Burundi, Cameroon, Rwanda, Tanzania, Zimbabwe, Zambia, Madagascar, and Mauritius. Traditionally in Uganda, nsenene were collected by children and women. They were given to the women's husbands in return for a new gomasi (a traditional dress for women). Although the women were made to do the treacherous work of collecting nsenene, they were never allowed to eat them. It was believed that women who consume nsenene would bear children with deformed heads like those of a conocephaline bush cricket. Nowadays, nsenene'' are consumed by most women in the areas where this insect is traditionally eaten.

References

External links
 
 Nsenene chronicle

Ruspolia
Insects described in 1838
Conocephalinae
Orthoptera of Africa
Edible insects
Ugandan cuisine
Kenyan cuisine
Tanzanian cuisine
Taxa named by Jean Guillaume Audinet-Serville